James B. Lynch (died 12 March 1954) was an Irish Fianna Fáil politician, who served for 16 years as a Teachta Dála (TD) before being elected as a Senator for three years.

A physician and surgeon before entering politics, Lynch was elected to Dáil Éireann on his first attempt, at the 1932 general election, when he stood as a Fianna Fáil candidate in the 7-seat Dublin South constituency. He was the last candidate to be elected, and took his seat in the 7th Dáil.

He was returned at the 1933 general election, but did not contest the 1937 general election. He stood again at the 1938 general election and was re-elected. He retained his seat at the next two general elections, but when constituency boundaries were revised at the 1948 general election, he stood in the neighbouring Dublin South-Central but was not elected. He stood again in Dublin South-Central at the 1951 general election, but lost again.

He then stood at the 1951 election to Seanad Éireann, winning won a seat on the Cultural and Educational Panel in the 7th Seanad, where he served until his death in March 1954. His widow Celia Lynch was a TD for Dublin South-Central from 1954 to 1977.

See also
Families in the Oireachtas

References

Year of birth missing
1954 deaths
Fianna Fáil TDs
Members of the 7th Dáil
Members of the 8th Dáil
Members of the 10th Dáil
Members of the 11th Dáil
Members of the 12th Dáil
Members of the 7th Seanad
Spouses of Irish politicians
Fianna Fáil senators
People educated at C.B.C. Monkstown
Medical doctors from Dublin (city)